The Mayo Senior Football Championship (currently known for sponsorship reasons as the Connacht Gold Mayo Senior Football Championship) is an annual Gaelic football competition contested by the top Mayo GAA clubs.

Westport are the title holders (2022) defeating Ballina Stephenites in the Final.

Honours
The trophy presented to the winners is the Paddy Moclair Cup, which was first presented for the 1971 final.

The winners of the Mayo Senior Championship qualify to represent their county in the Connacht Senior Club Football Championship. The winners can, in turn, go on to play in the All-Ireland Senior Club Football Championship.

History
The inaugural winners of the Mayo Championship were Castlebar Mitchels who won in 1888. The most successful team to date are Ballina Stephenites who have won on 36 occasions.

Roll of honour

List of finals

 Bold indicates Connacht championship winners.

See also
 List of Gaelic Games clubs in Mayo

References

External links
Official Mayo Website
Mayo on Hoganstand
Mayo Club GAA

 
Football
Senior Gaelic football county championships